The Streit Council for a Union of Democracies  is Washington, DC-based 501(c)(3) nonprofit foreign policy think tank working to unite democracies as a path toward greater individual freedom, international solidarity, and global stability. It aims for the creation of an international order of, by and for the people.

History 
As Federal Union, Inc.

The Streit Council is a successor to Federal Union Inc., founded in 1939 by Clarence Streit – a New York Times journalist and author of Union Now. He proposed a union of democracies around the Atlantic that would be capable enough to deter, and if necessary defend, against any combination of totalitarian regimes - thus avoiding the outbreak of WWII. Streit also advocated this initial federation of the world's leading democracies – with a common constitution, foreign policy, defense, and economy – as a strategy for world peace. This union of democracies would serve as a model for peaceful and democratic interaction among nations and their peoples, and remain open to accepting additional democracies as they emerged and expressed interest in joining.

Federal Union was the first popular US-based transnational movement to advocate a union of democracies. Throughout the war, the organization insisted that increasing American material and political assistance to the Allies without entering into a union with them would undermine the prospects for extending the democratic ethos and practices to international relations. Once the US intervened against the Axis, Federal Union campaigned for postwar structures that would lead to a democratic world order.

During and after the war, the organization enjoyed support from prominent figures such as Supreme Court Justice Owen Roberts, Secretary of the Interior Harold L. Ickes, and John Foster Dulles. In the postwar years, Streit’s ideas played a significant role in the formation of NATO. In 1949, Federal Union formed the Roberts-chaired Atlantic Union Committee (AUC) which pressed Congress to pursue a federation of democracies. The AUC served as the political wing of Federal Union, Inc.

This led to the introduction of the Atlantic Union Resolution in the US Congress in 1949, set forth by Senator J. William Fulbright, Senator Joseph R. McCarthy, and others. When the Resolution was again introduced in 1951, among those introducing it was Senator Richard M. Nixon. In the early 1950s, AUC also formed the Atlantic Assembly as an annual consultative assembly of parliamentarians from NATO countries, which formally became the North Atlantic Assembly in 1966 and was later transformed into the NATO Parliamentary Assembly (the name it operates under today).

For many years afterward, similar Atlantic Union Resolutions were introduced in every session of the US Congress, with Representatives Paul Findley, Donald Fraser and Morris Udall as the lead co-sponsors. The resolutions called for the formation of an "Atlantic Convention" to draft a constitution for an Atlantic Union that would be open, worldwide, to other democracies. The Bill passed in 1960 “with the support of both candidates for President – Nixon and John F. Kennedy – and Senate Majority Leader Lyndon Johnson. In the House of Representatives, it passed by an overwhelming 288 to 103.”

However, by the time the Convention was actually held in 1962, the US was only represented by a Citizen’s Commission, and was prevented by law from representing the US Government. Without American backing, the suggestions made by the Convention were never followed up on.

Federal Union Inc. was renamed the Association to Unite the Democracies (AUD) in 1985.

As the Streit Council

In 2004, the Streit Council was established as a successor to AUD. Since then, it has continued to work for the same principles, publishing research, analysis and commentary; hosting events; and contributing to the academic discourse on issues related to democratic integration and the democratization of the international order.

Leadership
Richard Conn Henry, a physics professor at Johns Hopkins University, serves as the current President of the Streit Council Board of Directors. Solomon Passy, a former member of the Bulgarian Parliament and Bulgarian Minister of Foreign Affairs (2001–2005), serves as Honorary President. Tiziana Stella, a specialist in transatlantic relations, NATO, European integration, US foreign policy and federalism, acts as the Executive Director, responsible for all major projects, including overall program and research planning and management, as well as staff management.

Programs 
The work of the Streit Council is divided into three core programs:

Transatlantic

The Transatlantic Program tracks and analyzes policy developments in the United States and Europe that affect the political, economic, and defense cohesion of the transatlantic area. This includes the rise of populism on both sides of the Atlantic, shifts in the orientation of US foreign policy, and internal and external pressures on the institutions that comprise the Euro-Atlantic system and the European Union. This program also promotes proactive policy options that address these challenges.

World Organization

The program on World Organization examines how the world’s democracies, and the transatlantic area in particular, can effect constructive consensus in the United Nations and other universal organizations to ensure that individual human dignity, freedom, and responsibility are permanently positioned at the center of world governance.

Federal Paradigms

The program on Federal Paradigms examines a) the historical and cultural factors that influence the formation and stability of federations, and b) federalism as a theory of international relations. As underexplored areas of study that shed light on the internal cohesion of democracies, potential areas for democratization in inter-democracy relations, democratic deficits in international institutions, and deficiencies in the international system, they carry significant implications for the future of democracy, U.S. foreign policy, transatlantic structures, and world organization.

Publications
The Streit Council regularly publishes research and analysis in the form of policy briefs, issues briefs and commentary.

, the Streit Council published a journal, Freedom & Union, a revival of the magazine of the same name launched by Federal Union, Inc. in 1946.

The Streit Council assisted in the English translation of former French Prime Minister Edouard Balladur's book For a Union of the West, published by the Hoover Institution in 2009.

Past Events 
The Streit Council has held events featuring expert analysis from guest speakers on a variety of topics, with numerous papers subsequently produced.

Topics covered have included “Euro-Atlantic Integration and Russia after September 11,” “Global Warming: Engaging the US at The G8 Summit,” and “Creating a Barrier-Free Transatlantic Market.” These events sought to address core concepts of the transatlantic relationship and global democratization.

These events included numerous speakers, such as Peter Rodman, US Assistant Secretary of Defense; Jose-Maria Aznar, Former Prime Minister of Spain; Antonio Martino, Former Italian Defense Minister; General William Odom, former Director of the US National Security Agency; Vladimir Lukin, Deputy Chairman of the State Duma and former Russian Ambassador to Washington; Anatol Lieven, Senior Research Fellow at The New America Foundation; and Edouard Balladur, Former Prime Minister of France.

See also
Clarence Streit
European Union
NATO
OECD
World Bank
Transatlantic relations

References

External links
 

Foreign policy and strategy think tanks in the United States
Non-profit organizations based in Washington, D.C.
Nonpartisan organizations in the United States
Political and economic think tanks in the United States
United States–European relations